Kenneth Dahlberg may refer to:

 Kenneth C. Dahlberg, American engineer and businessman
 Kenneth H. Dahlberg (1917–2011), American World War II fighter ace and businessman who was involved in the Watergate scandal